Casearia flavovirens is a species of flowering plant in the family Salicaceae. It is found in Java and Bali in  Indonesia. It is a vulnerable species threatened by habitat loss.

References

flavovirens
Flora of Java
Flora of Bali
Vulnerable plants
Taxonomy articles created by Polbot